Tunghai, Tung Hai, Tung-Hai may refer to:

 Tunghai University
 East China Sea, from its Mandarin pinyin romanization of its Chinese name (东海)
 East Sea (Chinese literature), from its Mandarin pinyin romanization of its Chinese name (東海), and one of the Four Seas

See also
 Donghai (disambiguation)
 East Sea (disambiguation)